Todd Miller may refer to:

Todd Miller (media executive), American media executive
Todd Miller (journalist), American journalist
Todd Miller (rugby union) (born 1974), New Zealand rugby player
Todd Miller (soccer) (born 1973), American soccer midfielder
Todd Miller (footballer) (born 2002), English footballer
Todd Douglas Miller, American documentary director, editor and producer
T.J. Miller (born 1981), American actor, director, writer, singer, voice artist, and comedian

See also
Matthew Todd Miller (born 1989), American teacher